OLiS (Oficjalna Lista Sprzedaży) is the official chart of the 100 highest selling music albums in Poland. The chart exists since 23 October 2000 and is provided by ZPAV.

Until January 2023 the chart consisted of 50 albums, based only on physical sale. Since January 2023 the chart consicts of 100 albums and is based on both physical sale (compiled by Kantar Polska) and listeners in four streaming services (compiled by Ranger agency): Spotify, YouTube (including YouTube Music and YouTube Premium), Apple Music and Deezer.

List of number-one albums

See also 
 Polish music charts
 List of number-one singles in Poland
 List of number-one dance singles in Poland

References

External links
 Official OLiS website

Polish record charts